Agios Nikolaos is a village and former municipality of Achaia and municipal district of Larissou located on the border of the prefectures of Achaia and Ilia. The Municipal District Aghios Nikolaos Spata has a population of 539 inhabitants and includes San Nicolas (384 inhabitants), the village of Agios Konstantinos (140 inhabitants) and the Monastery of Saint Nicholas (15 inhabitants). The name of the village  was Spata until 17 January 1957. The Monastery of St. Nicholas is a short distance from the village, which gave it its current name.

The monastery was built about 200 years ago, on the site of where they found the holy image of Saint Nicholas, causing further development. There are two versions that tell the story of how the icon was found. The first is that the icon was found by a single shepherd who followed one of his animals, leading him to the source of saint from which it drank water. The second that other shepherds were herding their animals across the monastery mountain when they suddenly saw a flash that traveled from west to east, ending at the location the monastery now stands. Upon investigation, they found the icon at that site.

Celebration
In Orthodox Christianity the day of honor to Saint Nicholas is 6 December. Orthodox Christians honour saint Nicholas on 10 May and in some places on 20 May. Saint Nicholas of Spata celebrates two of those days (6 December and 10 May). The great pilgrimage is during May.

Pilgrimage
The road to Saint Nicholas of Spata is widely famous in Greece and especially in Western Greece. Every year a week before and a week after of the celebration of Saint Nicholas on 10 May, many people from all around Greece travel the route of Saint Nicholas. The pilgrimage of Saint Nicholas is also famous in Italy and Cyprus.

References

Populated places in Achaea